Perry Andrew Williams (born December 11, 1946) is a former American football running back in the National Football League (NFL). He was drafted by the Green Bay Packers in the fourth round of the 1969 NFL Draft. He played college football at Purdue.

Williams is currently ranked high on the Boilermakers' career rushing charts; 8th in attempts (514), 11th in yards (2,049), 4th in rushing touchdowns (30), 5th in total touchdowns (31) and 14th in points (174).  In July 2013, Williams was touted as the No. 7 Running Back in Purdue history.

Williams finished in the Top Ten of eight offensive categories during his Purdue career; leading the Big Ten in touchdowns and rushing attempts as a sophomore.

1966 season
As a sophomore, Williams led the Boilermakers in rushing (750 yds), total yardage (844 yds) and touchdowns (11).  He scored both Purdue touchdowns in the Boilermakers' 14-13 victory over USC in the 1967 Rose Bowl.  The Boilermakers finished with a record of 9-2 and Top Ten ranking.

1967 season
During the 1967 season, Williams at fullback teamed with Leroy Keyes at halfback and Mike Phipps at quarterback to lead the Boilermakers to a record of 8-2, a season high ranking of No. 2 and a win vs. No. 1 Notre Dame.

Williams was named 1st Team All-Big Ten in 1967.

1968 season
The 1968 season was nearly to the 1967 season.  The Boilermakers were 8-2 again, Phipps, Keyes and Williams highlighted the offensive attack; the Boilermakers spent 4 weeks as the No. 1 team in the country.  Williams was named 1st Team All-Big Ten in 1968.

Following his Purdue career, Williams was named to the 1968 East-West Shrine Game in San Francisco, CA and the 1968 All-American All-Star game in Tampa, FL.

Williams played for the Green Bay Packers from 1969 to 1973 and the Chicago Bears in 1974 and then moved to the World Football League and spent the 1975 season with the San Antonio Wings.

References

External links
Green Bay Packers bio

1946 births
Living people
American football fullbacks
Purdue Boilermakers football players
Green Bay Packers players
Players of American football from Cincinnati
Chicago Bears players